Abdullah Majrashi may refer to:
 Abdullah Majrashi (footballer, born 1990)
 Abdullah Majrashi (footballer, born 1997)